Moonmilk (sometimes called mondmilch, also known as montmilch or as cave milk) is a white, creamy substance found inside limestone, dolomite, and possibly other types of caves. It is a precipitate from limestone comprising aggregates of fine crystals of varying composition usually made of carbonates such as calcite, aragonite, hydromagnesite, and/or monohydrocalcite.  

There are several hypotheses concerning the origin of moonmilk. One of these explains moonmilk to be the result of  bacterial action rather than from chemical reactions. According to this particular hypothesis, moonmilk is thought to have been created by the bacterium Macromonas bipunctata. However, no microbiological studies have been carried out so far. 
Moonmilk was originally explained as created by moon rays.

It is possible that moonmilk is formed by water that dissolves and softens the karst of caves consisting of carbonates, and carries dissolved nutrients that can be used by microbes, such as Actinomycetes. As the microbial colonies grow, they trap and accumulate chemically precipitated crystals in the organic matter-rich matrix formed that way. It has been suggested that these heterotrophic microbes, which produce CO2 as a waste product of respiration and possibly organic acids, may help to dissolve the carbonate.

In 2017, archæologists at the University of Chinese Academy of Sciences in China discovered a bronze jar dating to over 2,700 years ago containing animal fat combined with moonmilk, believed to have been a cosmetic face cream used by Chinese noblemen.

Being soft, moonmilk was frequently the medium for finger fluting, a form of prehistoric art.

The world's largest formation of brushite moonmilk is found in the Big Room of Kartchner Caverns State Park in southern Arizona.

In the middle of 16th century moonmilk was used as a medicine according to Gessner, and continued to be used as such until the 19th century. It is said to have cured acidosis and probably cardialgia by neutralizing an overdose of acid. It had no adverse health effects.

References

 George W. Moore and Nicholas Sullivan. Speleology: Caves and the Cave Environment, rev. 3rd ed. Dayton, Ohio: Cave Books, 1997.  (hardcover),  (paperback).

External links

 Moonmilk and Cave-dwelling Microbes
 Micromonas bipunctata
 The Virtual Cave: Moonmilk
 Novedades Rio Subterráneo de Leche de Luna (Spanish)

Speleothems